Earl Hines Plays Cole Porter is a solo album by pianist Earl Hines performing compositions by Cole Porter which was originally released as an LP on the Australian Swaggie label and rereleased on the New World label on CD in 1996.

Reception

AllMusic reviewer Scott Yanow commented: "Hines interprets the compositions as if he had been familiar with them for decades. His chancetaking improvisations have their hair raising moments (particularly when he suspends time) and are quite exciting. A superb effort by the immortal pianist who at 71 still seemed to be improving".

Track listing
All compositions by Cole Porter.
 "You Do Something to Me" - 7:39
 "Night and Day" - 9:50
 "Rosalie" - 4:08    
 "I've Got You Under My Skin" - 8:12
 "I Get a Kick Out of You" - 4:11
 "What Is This Thing Called Love?" - 5:00
 "You'd Be So Easy to Love" - 7:38

Personnel
Earl Hines - piano

References 

1975 albums
New World Records albums
Earl Hines albums
Cole Porter tribute albums
Solo piano jazz albums